The 2019-20 Colgate Raiders Men's ice hockey season was the 90th season of play for the program and the 59th season in the ECAC Hockey conference. The Raiders represented the Colgate University and played their home games at Class of 1965 Arena, and were coached by Don Vaughan, in his 27th season as their head coach.

On March 12, ECAC Hockey announced that the remainder of the tournament was cancelled due to the COVID-19 pandemic.

Roster

As of November 26, 2019.

Standings

Schedule and Results

|-
!colspan=12 style=";" | Regular Season

|-
!colspan=12 style=";" | 

|-
!colspan=12 style=";" | 

|- align="center" bgcolor="#e0e0e0"
|colspan=12|Colgate Won Series 2–0
|- align="center" bgcolor="#e0e0e0"
|colspan=12|Remainder of Tournament Cancelled

Scoring Statistics

Goaltending statistics

Rankings

Players drafted into the NHL

2020 NHL Entry Draft

† incoming freshman

References

Colgate Raiders men's ice hockey seasons
Colgate Raiders 
Colgate Raiders 
2019 in sports in New York (state)
2020 in sports in New York (state)